Paulo Roberto Galvão da Rocha (born April 1, 1951) is a Brazilian politician. He had represented Pará in the Federal Senate from 2015 to 2023. Previously, he was a deputy from Pará from 1991 to 2005 and from 2007 to 2011. He is a member of the Workers' Party.

References

Living people
1951 births
People from Pará
Members of the Federal Senate (Brazil)
Workers' Party (Brazil) politicians
Members of the Chamber of Deputies (Brazil) from Pará